Laminin subunit alpha-4 is a protein that in humans is encoded by the LAMA4 gene.

Function 

Laminins, a family of extracellular matrix glycoproteins, are the major noncollagenous constituent of basement membranes.  They have been implicated in a wide variety of biological processes including cell adhesion, differentiation, migration, signaling, neurite outgrowth and metastasis.

Laminins are composed of 3 non identical chains: laminin alpha, beta and gamma (formerly A, B1, and B2, respectively) and they form a cruciform structure consisting of 3 short arms, each formed by a different chain, and a long arm composed of all 3 chains.  Each laminin chain is a multidomain protein encoded by a distinct gene.  Several isoforms of each chain have been described.  Different alpha, beta and gamma chain isomers combine to give rise to different heterotrimeric laminin isoforms which are designated by Arabic numerals in the order of their discovery, i.e. alpha1beta1gamma1 heterotrimer is laminin 1.  The biological functions of the different chains and trimer molecules are largely unknown, but some of the chains have been shown to differ with respect to their tissue distribution, presumably reflecting diverse functions in vivo.

This gene encodes the alpha chain isoform laminin, alpha 4.  The domain structure of alpha 4 is similar to that of alpha 3, both of which resemble truncated versions of alpha 1 and alpha 2, in that approximately 1,200 residues at the N-terminus (domains IV, V and VI) have been lost. Laminin, alpha 4 contains the C-terminal G domain which distinguishes all alpha chains from the beta and gamma chains.  The RNA analysis from adult and fetal tissues revealed developmental regulation of expression, however, the exact function of laminin, alpha 4 is not known.

Gene 

Tissue-specific utilization of alternative polyA-signal has been described in literature.  Also, alternative splicing involving the first intron in the 5' UTR, and laminin alpha 4 like isoforms have been noted, however, the full-length nature of these products is not known.

References

Further reading 

 
 
 
 
 
 
 
 
 
 
 
 
 
 
 
 
 

Laminins